Athelia is a genus of corticioid fungi in the family Atheliaceae.  Some species are facultative parasites of plants (including crops) and of  lichens. The widespread genus contains 28 species. However, Athelia rolfsii was found to belong in the Amylocorticiales in a molecular phylogenetics study, but has yet not been renamed.

Species

Athelia acrospora
Athelia alnicola
Athelia alutacea
Athelia andina
Athelia arachnoidea
Athelia bambusae
Athelia binucleospora
Athelia bombacina
Athelia decipiens
Athelia fibulata
Athelia macularis
Athelia neuhoffii
Athelia nivea
Athelia ovata
Athelia phycophila
Athelia poeltii
Athelia repetobasidiifera
Athelia rolfsii
Athelia salicum
Athelia sibirica
Athelia singularis
Athelia subovata
Athelia tenuispora
Athelia teutoburgensis

References

External links

Atheliales
Atheliales genera
Taxa named by Christiaan Hendrik Persoon
Taxa described in 1818